Sunstorm is an American AOR musical project, originally featuring lead vocalist Joe Lynn Turner (formerly of Rainbow), bassist/vocalist Dennis Ward, keyboardist Jochen Weyer, as well as guitarist Uwe Reitenauer and drummer Chris Schmidt, both members of the band Pink Cream 69. The albums also featured artists such as Dann Huff and Jim Peterik as additional songwriters. The first album called Sunstorm was released in 2006, followed in 2009 by their second album House of Dreams. Emotional Fire is the third release, out in 2012.

In 2016, it was announced that Joe Lynn Turner would record a new Sunstorm album, this time following a heavier sound, similar to another project of his called Rated X, but keeping  the melodic side trademark of the project. For the album Edge of Tomorrow a new lineup was also announced with Alessandro Del Vecchio (Hardline, Jorn, Edge of Forever, Silent Force, ex-Voodoo Circle) on keyboards, Hammond organ, backing vocals and handling songwriting and production of the album. Other musicians were Simone Mularoni (DGM) on guitars, Nik Mazzucconi Labyrinth) on bass and Francesco Jovino (ex-Primal Fear, ex-Hardline, Voodoo Circle, Jorn) on drums. It was released  on May 13, 2016.

In 2018, the singles "Only The Good Will Survive" (released April 16) and "The Road to Hell" (released May 16) anticipated the new album The Road to Hell, released on June 8 again produced by Alessandro Del Vecchio via Frontiers. In this album drummer Edo Sala (Folkestone) replaced Francesco Jovino.

In December 2020 Frontiers Music announced Sunstorm new album called Afterlife that will released on March 12, 2021. It was anticipated by single "Swan Song" on January 15, 2021. The new Sunstorm band is formed by Ronnie Romero (Lords of Black, Rainbow, The Ferrymen, ex-CoreLeoni) and Italian drummer Michele Sanna, respectively in place of Joe Lynn Turner and Edo Sala.

On May 1, 2022, the photo of the preparation of a new video was published on the facebook page of Frontiers and the band. On the 17th of the same month the band and Frontiers published other photos in which Luca Princiotta can be seen replacing Simone Mularoni on guitar.
On June 6, 2022, the band released the cover and title of their new album Brothers in Arms and a photo of the new lineup. The title track is released on June 9 and is announced on August 5 as the release date of the disc.

Hot on the heels of their ‘Brothers In Arms’ studio album released in August 2022, Sunstorm announced that a special live digital release entitled ‘Still Roaring: The Studio Session’ would be issued on 21 October in both audio and as a full length video. Recorded when the group assembled to film promo clips for songs from their new studio record, they made full use of the time together to record this live studio session, which sees the quintet performing songs from across their catalogue.

Discography
 Sunstorm (2006)
House of Dreams (2009)
Emotional Fire (2012)
Edge of Tomorrow (2016)
The Road to Hell (2018)
Afterlife (2021)
Brothers in Arms (2022)
Still Roaring: The Studio Session (2022)

Members
 Ronnie Romero - lead vocals
 Alessandro Del Vecchio – keyboards, hammond organ, backing vocals
 Luca Princiotta - guitar
 Nik Mazzucconi – bass guitar
 Michele Sanna – drums

Former members
 Dennis Ward – bass guitar
 Uwe Reitenauer – guitar
 Jochen Weyer – keyboards
 Gunther Werno – keyboards
 Justin Dakey – keyboards
 Chris Schmidt – drums
 Francesco Jovino - drums
 Joe Lynn Turner – vocals
 Edo Sala - drums
 Simone Mularoni – guitar

Recording Timeline

References

External links
Biography

American hard rock musical groups